The Love of a Woman (French: L'amour d'une femme, Italian: L'amore di una donna) is a 1953 French-Italian drama film directed by Jean Grémillon and starring Micheline Presle, Massimo Girotti and Gaby Morlay. It was Grémillon's final feature film as director, although he made a handful of documentaries and short films.

The film's sets were designed by the art director Robert Clavel. It was shot at the Billancourt Studios in Paris and on location on the Île d'Ouessant off Finistère.

Synopsis
A young female doctor settles in a village on an island off the coast of Brittany, where she engages in a relationship with an engineer working on a project on the island.

Main cast
 Micheline Presle as Dr. Marie Prieur 
 Massimo Girotti as André Lorenzi 
 Gaby Morlay as Germaine Leblanc 
 Paolo Stoppa as Le curé 
 Marc Cassot as Marcel 
 Marius David as Lulu, l'adjoint d'André 
 Yvette Etiévant as Fernande de Malgorny 
 Roland Lesaffre as Yves 
 Robert Naly as Dr. Morel 
 Madeleine Geoffroy as Isabelle Morel

References

Bibliography
 Dayna Oscherwitz & MaryEllen Higgins. The A to Z of French Cinema. Scarecrow Press, 2009.

External links

1953 films
1950s French-language films
Films directed by Jean Grémillon
1953 drama films
Italian drama films
French drama films
Films shot at Billancourt Studios
Films set in Brittany
French black-and-white films
Italian black-and-white films
1950s French films
1950s Italian films